Mariano Antonio Guadalupe Escobedo de la Peña (16 January 1826 – 22 May 1902) was a Mexican Army general and Governor of Nuevo León.

Early life
Mariano Escobedo was born in San Pablo de los Labradores (which is today known as Galeana), Nuevo León on 16 January 1826. He was the youngest of six children born to Manuel Escobedo and Rita de la Peña.

Military career
In 1854 he defended from the liberal rows the Plan of Ayutla that ended the dictatorship of Antonio López de Santa Anna.

He took part in the Battle of Puebla on 5 May 1862, in Puebla, where thanks to his bravery, was promoted to colonel of cavalry. Later, he was promoted to general and organized an Army Corps which fought against the French invading troops, defeating them and capturing emperor Maximilian I in Querétaro (1867).

During the presidency of Benito Juárez (1858–1872) Mariano Escobedo was named commander-in-chief of the northern zone and after the restoration of the Mexican republic, he was governor of several states and military secretary in 1875, in addition to being president of the Supreme Court of Military Justice.

With the arrival of General Porfirio Díaz to the presidency, he was exiled to the United States, from which he organized an uprising against the dictator. Because of that he was taken prisoner in 1878. He died in Mexico, on 22 May 1902.

See also
General Mariano Escobedo International Airport

Governors of Nuevo León
Governors of San Luis Potosí
Mexican Secretaries of Defense
Presidents of the Chamber of Deputies (Mexico)
Members of the Senate of the Republic (Mexico)
Mexican generals
1826 births
1902 deaths
People from Galeana, Nuevo León